Barabash is a rural locality (village), the administrative center of the Barabashsky Rural Settlement, part of the Khasansky District in Primorsky Krai in Russia.

History 
Barabash was founded in 1884, named after Yakov Barabash, who was then chairman of a commission on the delineation of the Russo-Chinese border. In 1937, Barabashky District was created with its center in the village, but on 7 May 1947 was replaced by Khasansky District when the district center moved to Khasan.

From 1955 until 2012, Barabash was the location of the headquarters of the 17th Guards Rifle Division and its successor formations.

Demographics 

According to the Russian Census of 2010, Barabash had 5,691 inhabitants, including 3,983 men (70%) and 1,708 women (30%).  According to the Russian Census of 2002, it had 3,691 inhabitants, including 2,023 men (54.8%) and 1,668 women (45.2%).

Notable people 
 Viktor Suvorov, writer and defector
 Oleg Belokonev, Belarusian general and military leader

References

Citations

Bibliography 
 

Rural localities in Primorsky Krai